The William Kennison Wood House is a historic building located in Story County, Iowa, United States near the unincorporated community of Iowa Center.  An Ohio native, Wood settled on this property in 1851 from Polk County, Iowa.  He was a squatter here for two years before the county was organized.  Wood was a farmer and livestock producer, and became one of the largest landholders in the county.  He also served in the Iowa General Assembly from 1869 to 1873.  Wood married four times, and was widowed three times.  He lived here until his death in 1917.  This two-story frame Italianate house was built in three sections.  The last section of the house was the family room on the south side of the house in 1991, which replaced the original summer kitchen. The house was listed on the National Register of Historic Places in 1995.

References

Houses completed in 1865
Italianate architecture in Iowa
Houses in Story County, Iowa
Houses on the National Register of Historic Places in Iowa
National Register of Historic Places in Story County, Iowa